Indosinosuchus ("Indochinese crocodile") is a genus of teleosaurid neosuchian that lived during the Late Jurassic in what is now Thailand. It contains two species, the type species  I. potamosiamensis and I. kalasinensis, both recovered from the lower Phu Kradung Formation. It is unique among other named thalattosuchians, with its remains discovered from freshwater deposits, suggesting that at least some members of this group didn't live in the sea. The age of Indosinosuchus is unclear, as vertebrate fossils like Indosinosuchus support a Late Jurassic age, while palynological data suggests an Early Cretaceous (Berriasian) age.

References 

Jurassic crocodylomorphs
Late Jurassic reptiles of Asia
Fossils of Thailand
Fossil taxa described in 2019
Prehistoric pseudosuchian genera